August von Finck Sr. (18 July 1898 – 22 April 1980) was a German banker.

He was born in Kochel, German the son of Marie Fäustle and banker Vilhelm von Finck (1848–1924), founder of insurance giant Allianz and private bank Merck Finck & Co. Following the Anschluss of Austria to Nazi Germany, his business benefited greatly when the Nazis seized the Vienna-based firm of S M von Rothschild and in October 1939 sold it to Merck, Finck & Co. His son August von Finck Jr. sold the businesses to Barclays in 1990.

1898 births
1980 deaths
German untitled nobility
Finck family